INS Shivaji is an Indian naval station located in Lonavala, Maharashtra, India. It houses the Naval College of Engineering which trains officers of the Indian Navy and the Indian Coast Guard. It was commissioned on 15 February 1945 as HMIS Shivaji. It is located close to the Bhushi Dam.

Indian Navy already operates a first damage control simulator Akshat at INS Shivaji to train its officers and sailors on damage control on a warship at sea. Indian Navy's Nuclear, Biological and Chemical Defence (NBCD) School and Center for Marine Engineering Technology are also based here.

History 
INS Shivaji had its humble origin as replacement for the ‘Stokers’ Training School’ at HMIS Dalhousie, in Naval Dockyard, Bombay (now Mumbai). Commissioned by the then Governor of Bombay, John Colville, as HMIS Shivaji on 15 February 1945, it became INS Shivaji on 26 January 1950. To provide scope for further expansion and to isolate the trainee sailors from the country's politics, the Royal Indian Navy decided to shift the training establishment from Bombay to a quieter place. While the British were on the lookout for a suitable location, coincidentally an air accident took place in the Sahyadri Ranges. Those who came to investigate the accident found more than what they sought. Sandwiched between a sheer vertical rock face, covering the entire height of the hill range (the Tiger's Leap) on one side and another imposing rock formation (the Duke's Nose or Nagphani) on the other, here was this flat piece of land.

Schools 
INS Shivaji has three premier institutions viz. Centre of Marine Engineering and Technology (CMET), Centre of Excellence (CoE) and Nuclear, Biological and Chemical Defence (NBCD) School. INS Shivaji has an annual training throughput of more than 2800 officers and 7800 sailors from the Indian Navy. It also trains personnel from the navies of 20 friendly countries worldwide with an annual throughput of over 250 international trainees on an average.

Naval College of Engineering 

The Naval College of Engineering undertakes B.Tech. courses at the entry-level for technical officers’ entry into the Service. It is affiliated to Jawaharlal Nehru University, New Delhi. The faculty is a mix of (Defence Research and Development Organisation) DRDscientists and Naval officers.

Centre of Marine Engineering Technology (CMET) 

The Centre of Marine Engineering Technology (CMET) is a vast facility equipped to undertake ab initio, qualifying and marine specialisation courses for officers, sailors and civilians. It also undertakes a specialised pre-commissioning training of officers and sailors on actual equipment fitment onboard war vessels prior to appointment. The training wings also include the EPCT School. It has a Cadet’s Training Department which is similar to an Officers’ Training Academy which undertakes training of cadets in personality development, leadership qualities and waterman ship, so as to groom them into effective leaders of men and efficient managers of technology.

Nuclear, Biological, and Chemical Defense (NBCD) School 

The NBCD School conducts training in nuclear, biological and chemical aspects, damage control and fire-fighting. It has a world class damage control simulator namely Akshat. It is an excellent facility for practical training in simulated damage control procedures on board the ship.

Awards 

India's President Ram Nath Kovind awarded the coveted President’s Colours to INS Shivaji on 13 Feb 2020. The President’s Colour is the highest honour that can be bestowed upon any military unit in India.

See also
Indian navy

List of Indian Navy bases
List of active Indian Navy ships

Integrated commands and units

Armed Forces Special Operations Division
Defence Cyber Agency
Integrated Defence Staff
Integrated Space Cell
Indian Nuclear Command Authority
Indian Armed Forces
Special Forces of India

Other Lists

Strategic Forces Command
List of Indian Air Force stations
List of Indian Navy bases
India's overseas military bases

References

External links 
 INS Shivaji on the website of the Indian Navy

Shivaji
Monuments and memorials to Shivaji
Buildings and structures in Lonavala-Khandala